Khadakpada is a well developed locality in the west part Kalyan city of Thane district in Maharashtra, India.

It is a residential and commercial hub in the Kalyan Region. Khadakpada is located around 3 km away from Kalyan Junction railway station.

With spacious housing provided in well built complexes providing amenities offering better lifestyle, it has proven to be one of the most efficient localities towards the suburbs.
A branch of University of Mumbai is under construction in this upscale locality.

External links

Kalyan-Dombivli